The Federal Correctional Institution, Ashland (FCI Ashland) is a low-security United States federal prison for male inmates in the unincorporated area of Summit in Boyd County, Kentucky, approximately  outside the city of Ashland. It is operated by the Federal Bureau of Prisons, a division of the United States Department of Justice. It also includes a satellite prison camp for minimum-security male offenders.

History and description of facility
FCI Ashland opened in 1940. It currently holds inmates who are serving short-term sentences and are engaged in a "phasing down process" for prisoners who are close to completing their sentences in one of the regional prisons. FCI Ashland's primary service area includes Kentucky, southern Indiana, southern Ohio, western Pennsylvania (Greater Pittsburgh), Tennessee, and West Virginia.

FCI Ashland has a satellite camp which Forbes magazine ranked as one of the best places to go to prison in the United States. The camp holds a "wellness" program including aerobic exercise and stress reduction programs.

Notable incidents
In 1944, future civil rights leader Bayard Rustin, then 32 years old and serving a three-year sentence for his political (socialist) and religious (Quaker) refusal of the draft in World War II, helped lead a nonviolent campaign for racial integration of prison cell blocks and dining halls, including a hunger strike. The campaign was partially successful, although Rustin served time in solitary confinement and was eventually subjected to a punitive transfer to Lewisburg Penitentiary.

On December 5, 2008, former National Football League receiver Mark Ingram Sr. failed to report to FCI Ashland after being sentenced to 92 months on bank fraud and money laundering charges. Ingram, who was in and out of jail after his playing days ended in 1996, had already been granted a delay to watch his son, Mark Ingram Jr., finish his freshman season as a running back at the University of Alabama. Ingram asked for a second delay to watch his son play in the 2009 Sugar Bowl in New Orleans between Utah and Alabama. When the judge said no, Ingram went on the lam. US Marshals arrested him a month later in a Michigan motel room, two hours before the Sugar Bowl kickoff. He was on the bed watching the pre-game show on television. Ingram subsequently had two years added to his sentence. He was held at the Federal Correctional Institution, Yazoo City, a low-security facility in Mississippi, and was released in 2015.

On May 13, 2014, local media outlets reported that 46-year-old James Lewis, a former correctional officer at FCI Ashland, had been sentenced to 15 months in federal prison. Lewis had pleaded guilty to conspiring with inmate Gary Musick and Musick's girlfriend, Cindy Gates, to bring marijuana and nude photographs into the prison between December 2010 and February 2012. Musick was convicted of conspiracy while Gates pleaded guilty to a misdemeanor conspiracy charge and was sentenced to probation.

Notable inmates (current and former)

See also
List of U.S. federal prisons
Federal Bureau of Prisons
Incarceration in the United States

References

External links
 FCI Ashland

1940 establishments in Kentucky
Buildings and structures in Boyd County, Kentucky
Ashland
Prisons in Kentucky